Byron Kilbourn (September 8, 1801December 16, 1870) was an American surveyor, railroad executive, and politician who was an important figure in the founding of Milwaukee, Wisconsin.  He was the 3rd and 8th mayor of Milwaukee.

Biography 
Kilbourn was born in Granby, Connecticut. In 1803, he moved with his family to Worthington, Ohio, which his father had helped found that year. Kilbourn's father was James Kilbourne, a colonel during the War of 1812 and a U.S. Representative from Ohio from 1813 to 1817.

Byron Kilbourn worked in Ohio as a surveyor and as a state engineer. He first visited Wisconsin in 1834, landing at Green Bay, and worked as a government surveyor in the area. He later deemed the area near the Milwaukee River to be a promising location for commerce, and he purchased land there. In 1837 Kilbourn founded Kilbourntown (present-day Westown), which rivaled with Solomon Juneau's Juneautown (present-day East Town) and George Walker's Walker's Point. He was a key figure in the Milwaukee Bridge War in 1845. In 1846, the three combined and formed the city of Milwaukee, Wisconsin. He served in the Wisconsin Territorial House of Representatives in 1845 and was a member of the second Wisconsin Constitutional Convention of 1847. Kilbourn also served as a Milwaukee alderman and was elected to two non-consecutive terms as mayor in 1848 and 1854. Kilbourn was also an 1849 candidate for the United States Senate, but was defeated by incumbent Isaac P. Walker.

When working as a highway commissioner for the Wisconsin Territorial Legislature, Kilbourn founded what was to become the City of West Bend in 1845. In 1857, Kilbourn founded the city of Kilbourn City, now known as the city of Wisconsin Dells.

Kilbourn became involved in the railroad industry, serving as president of the Milwaukee and Mississippi Railroad for about three years from around 1849 until 1852. He was fired by the railroad's board of directors following allegations of mismanagement and fraud. He then started a new railroad from Milwaukee to La Crosse as a competitor with his former railroad. The La Crosse & Milwaukee Railroad was chartered in 1852 and became the second railroad to connect Milwaukee to the Mississippi River. Kilbourn's public career was ruined following a scandal alleging the use of around $900,000 ($ today) in railroad bonds to bribe dozens of state officials including Governor Coles Bashford, for land grants necessary for the railroad. The La Crosse & Milwaukee Railroad Company failed in the aftermath of the scandal and subsequent investigations.

In 1868, a decade after the railroad scandals, Kilbourn moved to Jacksonville, Florida to relieve arthritis symptoms. He died there December 16, 1870, age 69, and was buried in Jacksonville. Historic Milwaukee, Inc. worked to have him re-interred in Milwaukee because he was the only one of the three Milwaukee founders not buried in there. In late 1998 Kilbourn's remains were returned to Milwaukee for interment at Forest Home Cemetery.

References

Bibliography

External links 
 Kilbourn, Byron (1801-1870) at Wisconsin Historical Society

Members of the Wisconsin Territorial Legislature
Wisconsin city council members
Mayors of Milwaukee
Businesspeople from Milwaukee
American surveyors
19th-century American railroad executives
American city founders
People from Granby, Connecticut
People from Worthington, Ohio
1801 births
1870 deaths
19th-century American politicians